Bushido: The Soul of Japan is a book written by Inazō Nitobe exploring the way of the samurai. It was published in 1899.

Overview
Bushido: The Soul of Japan is, along with Hagakure by Yamamoto Tsunetomo (1659–1719), a study of the way of the samurai. A best-seller in its day, it was read by many influential foreigners, among them President Theodore Roosevelt, President John F. Kennedy and Robert Baden-Powell, the founder of the Boy Scouts. 

Nitobe originally wrote Bushido: The Soul of Japan in English (1899), in Monterey, California, though according to the book's preface it was written in Malvern, Pennsylvania. The book was first published in English in New York in 1899.  It was subsequently translated into Japanese in 1908 by Sakurai Hikoichirō. Thereafter, Yanaihara Tadao’s translation became the standard text in Japanese which was published by Iwanami Shoten. 

As Japan underwent deep transformations of its traditional lifestyle and military while becoming a modern nation, and the result of his meditations was this seminal work. A fine stylist in English, he wrote many books in that language, which earned him a place among the best known Japanese writers of his age.

He found in Bushido, the Way of the Warrior, the sources of the seven virtues most admired by his people: rectitude, courage, benevolence, politeness, sincerity, honor and loyalty.

He also delved into the other indigenous traditions of Japan, such as Buddhism, Shintoism, Confucianism and the moral guidelines handed down over hundreds of years by Japan's samurai and sages.
Nitobe  sought similarities and contrasts by citing  the shapers of European and American thought and civilization going back to the Romans, the Greeks and Biblical times. He found a close resemblance between the samurai ethos of what he called Bushido and the spirit of medieval chivalry and the ethos of ancient Greece, as observed in books such as the Iliad of Homer.

Criticism
The book has been criticized as portraying the samurai in terms of Western chivalry which had different interpretations compared to the pre-Meiji period bushido as a system of warrior values that were focused on valor rather than morals.

Nitobe Inazo did not coin the term bushidō. The written form bushidō was first used in Japan in 1616 with the Kōyō Gunkan. In the 17th century, the concept of bushidō spread to the common population such as the ukiyo-e book  by artist Hishikawa Moronobu (1618–1694) which was written in the accessible kana and includes the word bushidō. Bushidō as a system of warrior values existed in multiple forms dating back to the medieval era. The unwritten form of bushidō first appeared with the rise of the samurai class and the shogun Minamoto no Yoritomo (1147–1199) in the 12th century.

References

Further reading 
Inazo Nitobe, Bushido: The Soul of Japan, Kodansha International, Tokyo, 2002.  
John W. Dower, War Without Mercy: Race & Power in the Pacific War, Pantheon Books, New York, 1986.

External links
Complete text of 13th edition online from Gutenberg

1899 non-fiction books
Books about Japan
Bushido
Codes of conduct
Eastern philosophical literature
Ethics books
Japanese books
Modern philosophical literature
Samurai
Warrior code